The Ricoh GR is a series of point-and-shoot, or compact, digital cameras made by Ricoh. The GR name was previously used for Ricoh's GR series of film cameras.

Ricoh GR digital cameras

 GR Digital
 
 Announced in September 2005
 Lens: 28 mm f/2.4
 Sensor size: 1/1.8" 
 GR Digital II

 Announced in October 2007
 Lens: 28 mm f/2.4
 Sensor size: 1/1.75"
 GR Digital III
 Announced in July 2009
 Lens: 28 mm f/1.9
 Sensor size: 1/1.7"
 GR Digital IV
 Announced in September 2011
 Lens: 28 mm f/1.9
 Sensor size: 1/1.7"
 The last "GR Digital" model; subsequent models would simply be called "GR"
 GR

 Announced in April 2013
 Lens: 28 mm f/2.8
 Sensor size: APS-C
 GR II
 Announced in June 2015
 Lens: 28 mm f/2.8
 Sensor size: APS-C
 GR III
 Announced in September 2018
Lens: 28 mm f/2.8
 Sensor size: APS-C

Notes

References

External links
 Ricoh Global Site
 Ricoh GR Digital I review at Digital Photography Review
 Ricoh GR Digital III review at C-Net
 Ricoh GR / GR Digital V review at Digital Photography Review
 Ricoh Talk Forum at Digital Photography Review

Lists of photography topics
Ricoh digital cameras
Photography equipment